Shingen Yashida is a supervillain appearing in American comic books published by Marvel Comics as an adversary of Wolverine.

The character was played by Hiroyuki Sanada in the 2013 film The Wolverine.

Publication history
Shingen first appeared in Wolverine #1 (Sept. 1982) and was created by Chris Claremont and Frank Miller.

Fictional character biography
"Mariko Yashida" was the daughter of Japanese crime lord "Lord Shingen", leader of Clan "Yashida". She first met the feral mutant Wolverine when the X-Men sought the help of her cousin, the Japanese mutant hero Sunfire. Although initially frightened by the ferocious-looking Wolverine, Mariko found herself attracted to him. Similarly, Wolverine was charmed by her beauty and refined manner. The two spent a great deal of time together in Japan, ultimately falling in love when she visited him in New York. To settle a personal debt incurred during his rise to power, Shingen forced his daughter Mariko Yashida to marry criminal boss Noboru Hideki. Wolverine found out Noboru beat Mariko nearly to death and confronted Noboru but relented from killing him upon Mariko's insistence. Shingen had Wolverine poisoned, temporarily weakening him so that Shingen could beat and humiliate the superhuman mutant in a duel with bokken in front of Mariko. Shingen used his expert knowledge of human anatomy to secretly attack Wolverine's nerve endings in such a way so as to make the duel life-threatening. But as Mariko did not know this, when Wolverine attempted to use his claws to save himself, it appeared to Mariko that Wolverine was cheating. Mariko did not know that Wolverine's body had been saturated with enough lethal poison to kill several dozen ordinary men, or that Shingen was the one who was actually cheating in the duel. This had the effect of disgracing Wolverine in front of her, which was the design of Shingen. Logan was then dumped onto the Tokyo streets and found by Yukio, Shingen's best assassin, who participated in deception with the Hand ninja clan to manipulate Wolverine into assassinating a rival crime lord, using Mariko as unwitting bait for additional motivation. After his role was completed, Shingen ordered Logan killed, but Yukio ignored the order. This led to the Hand being sent to enforce his will. In the events resulting from that action, including the death of a personal friend by Yukio, Wolverine realized that Yukio was the one who poisoned him at Shingen's residence and was being played for a fool at apparently Shingen's orders. After a philosophic epiphany about humanity, Logan then completely destroyed the Yashida criminal empire and confronted Shingen a second time. Shingen did not survive the confrontation. Mariko revealed she'd planned to kill her dishonorable father personally then commit seppuku in recompense had not Logan prevented her. Afterward, Mariko and Wolverine decided to marry, with the X-Men receiving an invitation from the Emperor of Japan for the event. 

It is later revealed that his illegitimate son Kenuichio Harada wanted to inherit Shingen's position. 

Shingen was briefly resurrected by Phaedra of the Hand as part of a campaign of revenge against Wolverine.

Powers and abilities
Lord Shingen had no superhuman abilities but was in peak physical condition despite his age, and he was one of the finest swordsmen and martial artists in all of Japan. Highly intelligent, he had extensive knowledge of human anatomy, pressure points, and great knowledge of poisons and assassination techniques. Shingen was highly skilled in the management of criminal organizations and very well connected in the international criminal underworld, particularly in areas of drug traffic.

Other versions
In the comic series Exiles, a younger version of Shingen Yashida exists in the home reality of Mariko Yashida (aka Sunfire).

In other media

 Lord Shingen appears in Marvel Anime: Wolverine, voiced by Hidekatsu Shibata in the Japanese version and by Fred Tatasciore in the English dub. This version is the leader of the Kuzuryū syndicate. He arranges for Mariko Yashida to be married to Hideki Kurohage of Madripoor, with the series focusing on Wolverine working to prevent the marriage. In a last-ditch attempt to stop him, Shingen dons special armor to battle Wolverine, but is killed by the latter and Yukio.
 Shingen Yashida appears in The Wolverine, portrayed by Hiroyuki Sanada. In addition to being the father of Mariko Yashida, this version is son of billionaire Ichirō Yashida and the foster brother of Yukio. After the Yashidas' technology empire is left to Mariko despite Shingen's attempts to cover up his father's near-bankruptcy, Shingen grows spiteful of Ichirō and conspires with Japan's Minister of Justice, Noburo Mori, and the Yakuza to kill Mariko for taking what he saw as his and gain his father's admiration. After he is poisoned by Viper, Shingen dons the Yashida Clan's traditional samurai armor and attacks Yukio, but is killed by Logan.

References

External links
 Shingen Yashida at Marvel Appendix
 Silver Samurai II at Marvel Wiki
 Silver Samurai II at Comic Vine

Characters created by Chris Claremont
Characters created by Frank Miller (comics)
Comics characters introduced in 1982
Fictional Japanese people
Fictional yakuza
Marvel Comics martial artists
Marvel Comics supervillains
Superhero film characters
Fictional swordfighters in comics
Wolverine (comics) characters
X-Men supporting characters